U.S. Route 19 (US 19) in Pennsylvania closely parallels Interstate 79 (I-79) for its entire length. US 19 enters Pennsylvania from West Virginia in Greene County near Mount Morris.  Its northern terminus is at US 20 in the city of Erie.  Part of it is named for Commodore Oliver Hazard Perry, hero of the Battle of Lake Erie.

Route description

In northern Washington County, US 19 was modernized after the former Pittsburgh Railways Interurban (PRCo) trolley service was discontinued in August 1953. Initially, US 19 ran parallel to the trolley line, and later expanded over the tracks through part of Mt. Lebanon in southern Allegheny County.

US 19 then proceeds north through Pittsburgh's Northside, West View, Perrysville and Ross Township, McCandless Township and Wexford, where it is referred to as Perry Highway. In Cranberry Township, it connects with I-79, the Pennsylvania Turnpike, and Pennsylvania Route 228 (PA 228). Continuing through Mercer and Crawford counties, the route meets its terminus at a junction with US 20 in Erie.
The US 19 Truck designation exists in Pittsburgh, running from Wexford, Pennsylvania to Mt. Lebanon, Pennsylvania. Although both of that route's termini are with the regular US 19, the two routes also intersect near the Fort Pitt Tunnel on Pittsburgh's West End.

History

US 19 in Pennsylvania has maintained a similar alignment for much of its history. In 1928, US 19 was moved to its current route between Pittsburgh and Meadville. The West End Bridge in Pittsburgh was completed in 1932, and US 19 was realigned to cross the bridge. In 1936, US 19 was moved to its current alignment between Zelienople and Harmony. Through the 1940s and 1950s, different parts of US 19 were widened.

In 1987, the Phase One project started to connect two sections of Ohio River Boulevard near Western Avenue and Chateau Street. Phase Two of the project included a new interchange between the PA 65 expressway (concurrent with US 19 west of the interchange) and the West End Bridge. The bridge was closed for two years for construction, but reopened in 1991, while construction finished in 1992.

In 2003, the Pennsylvania Department of Transportation (PennDOT) started a project to build a US 19 tunnel under the Norfolk Southern Railway, as well as align the West End Bypass with the West End Circle, the intersection of US 19, PA 51, PA 60, and PA 837. The project was completed in 2010.

In 2016, a diverging diamond interchange was built at the intersection of US 19 and I-70/I-79 in South Strabane Township.

PennDOT started construction on a multi-lane roundabout at the intersection of US 19, US 6, US 322, and PA 98 in Vernon Township, near Meadville. Construction was expected to be completed in October 2019.

PennDOT has also started construction on an intersection improvement project at the northern intersection of US 19 and PA 97. PA 97 will be realigned to meet US 19 at a 90 degree angle, and new left turn lanes and traffic signals will be installed. Construction is expected to be completed in October 2019.

Major intersections

See also

References

External links

Pennsylvania Highways: US 19
US 19 at AARoads.com
Pennsylvania Roads – US 19

 Pennsylvania
19
Transportation in Washington County, Pennsylvania
Transportation in Butler County, Pennsylvania
Transportation in Lawrence County, Pennsylvania
Transportation in Mercer County, Pennsylvania
Transportation in Crawford County, Pennsylvania
Transportation in Erie County, Pennsylvania
Transportation in Allegheny County, Pennsylvania
Transportation in Greene County, Pennsylvania